Rabbi Aharon Sorasky (surname also spelled Surasky or Sorsky) is a Haredi author in Israel, his specialty being biographies about Orthodox rabbis. He has also written under the pseudonym A. Safran.

Personal life 

Rabbi Sorasky was born on April 28, 1940 and is a Slonimer chossid. He began his writing career with the Hamodia and worked for the Netzach publishing company. He has been hired by several Hasidic courts to write biographies about their rebbes.

Praise 
Rabbi Hanoch Teller wrote that "for decades, Rabbi Surasky has established himself as the most eminent, reliable and stylistically graceful biographer of our time–perhaps of all time." Rabbi Teller also praises him as a "serious talmid chacham and erudite scholar." Rabbi Simcha Wasserman praised him for his work, Ohr Elchonon, about Rabbi Wasserman's father, saying, "Rabbi Aharon Sorasky, the distinguished author and scholar, gathered and organized the material into a justly acclaimed Ohr Elchonon in Hebrew. Its accurate portrayal of my father's character, accoplishents, and teachings is an eloquent tribute to Rabbi Sorasky's understanding and skill." Rabbi Gedalia Anemer, rosh yeshiva of Yeshiva of Greater Washington, called Rabbi Sorasky's biography on Rabbi Yekusiel Yehuda Halberstam, Lapid HaEsh, "an exceptional work which portrays the life of the great tzadik and his many contributions to Klal Yisrael (the Jewish people)."

Bibliography

Torah 
 MeMaayanot HaNetzach: Machrozet Peninim LeParshat HaShavuah (5 volumes) commentary on the Weekly Torah portions
 MeMaayanot HaNetzach: Pirkei Avot, compilation of Acharonim's commentaries on Pirkei Avot
 MiSod Siach Chassidim: Derech Emunah Bacharti, 2006, on Hassidic faith in their Rebbes
 MiSod Siach Chassidim: VeAhavtah LeReachah KaMochah, 2015, sequel to MiSod Siach Chassidim: Derech Emunah Bacharti
 Achiezer, 1970, by Rabbi Chaim Ozer Grodzensky, arranged by Rabbi Sorasky

Hasidism 
 Yesod HaMaalah, 1991, history of Hassidism in the Land of Israel
 Marbitzei Torah BiOlam HaChassidut, 1986, biographies on Hassidic rebbes
 Lapid HaEsh: Pirkei Chayav HaMufla'im Shel Mofet HaDor K"K ABDDK"K Tzanz-Klausenberg Ztzvk"l, 1996, 2 volume biography of Rabbi Yekusiel Yehudah Halberstam 
later translated into English by Judah Lifschutz, under the names The Klausenburger Rebbe: The War Years and The Klausenburger Rebbe: Rebuilding
 Rosh Golat Ariel: Toldot Chayav U'Poalo Shel Rabbeinu Avraham Mordechai Alter MeGur, 1990, co-authored by Rabbi Avraham Mordechai Segal, 2 volume biography of Rabbi Avraham Mordechai Alter
 Pe'er Yisrael: Maran Admor HaRav Yisrael MiGur Zy"a Ha"Beis Yisrael", (1997), three volume biography of Rabbi Yisrael Alter
 VaYechi Yosef,  2 volume biography of Rabbi Yosef Greenwald
 BeLabat Esh, 1984, biography of Rabbi Moshe Yechiel Epstein
 Zecher Kedoshim: Matzevet Zikaron LeShtibel Shel Chasidei Slonim BiIr Lodz, Polin, on the Slonim community in Lodz
 Shoshelet Spinka, 1990, biogrophies of the Spinka rebbes
 Heichal Bobov, 1996, biographies of the Bobover rebbes
 Geonei Polin: Chayeihem VeToratam Shel Rabbi Menachem Ziemba MePraga, Rabbi Aryeh Tzvi Frumer MeKozhiglov, (1983) biogrophies of Polish rabbis
 Moreshet Tchebin: Darkei Chayav UPoalo Shel Rabbi Dov Berish Weidenfeld, (1987/1988) biography of Rabbi Dov Berish Weidenfeld
 Toldot Yehoshuah, on Rabbi Yehoshua Spira, Rebbe of Ribatitch and Bluzhev

Other 

 Orot MiMizrach: Toldot Ro'im Ruchni'im LeYahadut HaSepharadit, 1974, biographies about Sephardic rabbis
 D'muyot Hod, 1967, three volume series on gedolim
 Toldot HaChinuch HaTorati BeTekufah HaChadashah,  history of Haredi chinuch in the Land of Israel spanning 100 years
 Marbitzei Torah U'Mussar: BeYeshivot Nusach Lita MeTekufat Volozhin Ve'ad Yamenu, 1976, four volumes, biographies on Lithuanian Orthodox rabbis
 Rabbi Shimon VeTorato: Korot Chayav VeShitato HaTalmudit Shel Rabbi Shimon Yehudah HaKohen Shkop, 1971, biography of Rabbi Shimon Shkop
 Ohr Elchonon: Sipur Chayav Shel Rabbi Elchanan Bunim Wasserman, biography of Rabbi Elchonon Wasserman
later translated into English by Artscroll, under the name Reb Elchonon
 VeZot LeYehudah: Mesechet Chayav VePo'alav Shel Rabbeinu HaGadol Maran Rabbi Yehudah Tzadka Ztzvk"l, 2012, biography of Rabbi Yehuda Tzadka
 Rabbi Shimon Chassidah: Esh Yokedet, biography of Rabbi Shimon Sofer of Erlau
 Melech BeYofyo: Toldos Chayav, Po'alo VeDarko BeKodesh Shel Maran HaGaon Rabbi Yechezkel Abramsky Ztzvk"l, 2004, 2 volume biography of Rabbi Yechezkel Abramsky
 Chevlei Yotzer: Sipur Chayav UPoalo Shel Meyased Bnei-Brak Rabbi Yitzchak Gerstenkorn, 1974, biography of Rabbi Yitzchak Gerstenkorn, one of the founders and first mayor of Bnei Brak
 HaRav MiPonevezh: Toldot HaGaon HaGadol HaRav R' Yosef Shlomo Kahaneman zt"l, 1997, biography of Rabbi Yosef Shlomo Kahaneman
 HaChazon Ish BeDorotav: Toldot Rabbi Avraham Yeshaya Karelitz, 1983, on Rabbi Avraham Yeshaya Karelitz (the Chazon Ish)
 Shluchah DeRachmana: Pirkei Chaim VeYetzirah Shel Shraga Feivel Mendelowitz Zt"l, 1992, biography of Rabbi Shraga Feivel Mendelowitz
Later adapted into English by Yonasan Rosenblum under the name Reb Shraga Feivel: The Life and Times of Rabbi Shraga Feivel Mendlowitz, the Architect of Torah in America
 Zuto Shel Nahar: Sipurim Nevcharim, 1983, stories of Tzaddikim
 Esh HaTorah (two volumes), on Rabbi Aharon Kotler

References 

Living people
1940 births

Jewish writers
Bibliographers of Hebrew literature
20th-century Israeli non-fiction writers
Israeli male writers
Haredi writers
Israeli Hasidim